Tequestaconus is an extinct genus of sea snails, marine gastropod mollusks in the family Conidae.

Species

References

 Petuch E.J., Drolshagen M. & Herndl G. (2015). Cone shells of the Okeechobean Sea (Pliocene, Pleistocene). Harxheim: Conchbooks. 179 pp.

Conidae